William Edwin Price (10 January 1841 – 10 February 1886) was an English Liberal Party politician who sat in the House of Commons from 1868 to 1880.

Price was the son of William Philip Price, M.P. for Gloucester and his wife Frances Ann Chadborn, daughter of John Chadborn of Gloucester. He was educated at Eton College, at University College, London graduating BA in 1859, and at the Royal Military Academy, Woolwich. He served in the 36th Regiment of Foot until his retirement in February 1865. He was a captain of the Royal South Gloucester Militia, and of the 3rd Gloucester City Rifle Volunteers.
 
At the 1868 general election Price was elected as the Member of Parliament for the borough of Tewkesbury. He was re-elected in 1874 and at the general election in April 1880 but his election was declared void on  29 June 1880.

Price died at the age of 44.

His son Morgan Philips Price was later a (Labour) M.P.

References

External links

1841 births
1886 deaths
People educated at Eton College
Alumni of University College London
Liberal Party (UK) MPs for English constituencies
UK MPs 1868–1874
UK MPs 1874–1880
UK MPs 1880–1885